During the 1955–56 English football season, Brentford competed in the Football League Third Division South. A promising 6th-place finish was achieved with a squad mainly drawn from the club's youth system.

Season summary 
After finishing the previous season strongly, Brentford went into the 1955–56 Third Division South season full of optimism. Youth products Jim Towers and Dennis Heath had established themselves in the first team, while George Francis and Gerry Cakebread also made their debuts. Full backs Alan Bassham, George Lowden and half backs Wally Bragg and George Bristow also made up the ranks of home-grown players in the first team squad and forward John Pearson would be another to graduate from the youth team during the 1955–56 season. Chelsea full back Sid Tickridge was manager Bill Dodgin Sr.'s only major signing of the off-season and he replaced Frank Latimer as club captain.

Despite winning more games than they had lost, Brentford hovered in mid-table during the opening three months of the season. Forward Jeff Taylor led the attack and scored 11 goals in as many matches during a five-week period in September and October 1955. Buoyed by four goals in five league matches by Wendell Morgan and news from the boardroom that a £9,000 profit had been made on the year ending in May 1955 (equivalent to £ in ), the Bees moved as high as 8th-place in early December, before losing form again later in the month.

Victory over Exeter City on 4 February 1956 was the first win of a strong run which lasted for the remainder of the season and resulted in a 6th-place finish, 11 points behind the top-three clubs. During the season, 22-goal Jim Towers and goalkeeper Gerry Cakebread established themselves as two of the best players in the Third Division South. After nearly 27 years as a player, assistant manager and caretaker manager at Griffin Park, long-serving Jimmy Bain retired in May 1956. He received a Long Service Medal from the Football League in recognition and was awarded a testimonial match to be played in October 1956.

League table

Results
Brentford's goal tally listed first.

Legend

Football League Third Division South

FA Cup

 Sources: 100 Years Of Brentford, Statto, 11v11

Playing squad 
Players' ages are as of the opening day of the 1955–56 season.

 Sources: 100 Years Of Brentford, Timeless Bees

Coaching staff

Statistics

Appearances and goals

Players listed in italics left the club mid-season.
Source: 100 Years Of Brentford

Goalscorers 

Players listed in italics left the club mid-season.
Source: 100 Years Of Brentford

Amateur international caps

Management

Summary

Transfers & loans

References 

Brentford F.C. seasons
Brentford